Waah! Tera Kya Kehna (English: Wow! You're Amazing) is a 2002 Hindi comedy film directed by Manoj Agrawal starring Govinda and Raveena Tandon.

Plot
Krishna Oberoi (Shammi Kapoor), a renowned businessman has two sons Dilip (Shakti Kapoor) and Ashish (Rana Jung Bahadur). He doesn't trust his sons as they are after his property. Raj (Govinda), Krishna's grandson, loves his grandfather more than anyone in his family and also Krishna is only devotee to Raj. Krishna wants Raj to take care of all his property after his death. Raj gets attracted to Meena (Preeti Jhangiani). After some incidents, they get engaged. After engagement Raj meets with an accident where he gets brain damaged, resulting in showing his childish behaviour. This results in the cancellation of the wedding with Meena. Due to conspiracy caused by Dilip's son Vikram (Mohnish Behl), Raj has to part way from his grandfather along with Murari (Kader Khan). When Raj learns that Meena won't come to meet Raj, Raj flees from Murari's house, disappearing mysteriously in the sandstorm. Meanwhile, Dilip, Ashish and Vikram along with Charles (Ashish Vidyarthi) kill Krishna by mixing a drug in the tea and later throwing him from top of the building.

At the same time, Murari meets Raj's lookalike Banne Khan (also Govinda), his wife, Salma Khan (Raveena Tandon) and their assistant. He wants Banne Khan to act as Raj and get Raj's property back and teach them a lesson. After some settlements, Banne Khan agrees with Salma Khan to act as Raj's nurse. In the meantime, original Raj returns and both he and Banne Khan reunite to eliminate his uncles and Charles, in which they succeed.

Cast

Govinda as Raj Oberoi / Inspector Banne Khan (Double Role)
Raveena Tandon as Inspector Salma Khan
Preeti Jhangiani as Meena
Shammi Kapoor as Krishna Oberoi
Kader Khan as Murari
Shakti Kapoor as Dilip Oberoi
Mohnish Bahl as Vikram Oberoi "Vicky"
Ashish Vidyarthi as Charles
Rana Jung Bahadur as Ashish Oberoi
Navneet Nishan as Anju Oberoi (Dilip's wife)
 Supriya Karnik as Madhu Oberoi (Ashish's wife)
Tej Sapru as Lawyer and Madhu and Anju's brother
Rajat Bedi as Meena's brother
Rakesh Bedi as Murari's neighbour
Anil Dhawan as Meena's father
Anju Mahendru as Meena's mother
Viju Khote as Manager of Raj Oberoi 
Raju Srivastava as Banne Khan's assistant
Razzak Khan as Goon
Rakhi Sawant as Dancer (Song: "I Want Money")

Soundtrack
Music composed by Jatini-Lalit.

References

External links 
 

2000s Hindi-language films
2002 films
2002 comedy films
Films scored by Jatin–Lalit
Indian comedy films
Hindi-language comedy films